Dilip Biswas (1946 – 12 July 2006) was a Bangladeshi film director. Beside film direction, he was also actor and musician.

Career

As director

As actor
 Habur Biyer

As producer
 Akritoggo
 Shoshurbari Zindabad
 Mayer Morjada

As singer 
 Behulaa
 Anwara
 Momer Alo
 Dui Bhai
 Alomoti
 Santan
 Chena Ochena

Honors

National Film Awards 
 Winner Best Director -

References

External links

1946 births
2006 deaths
Bangladeshi male actors
Bangladeshi male film actors
Bangladeshi film producers
20th-century Bangladeshi male singers
20th-century Bangladeshi singers
Bangladeshi film directors
Best Screenplay National Film Award (Bangladesh) winners
Best Dialogue National Film Award (Bangladesh) winners
20th-century screenwriters